The 1917–18 season was Manchester United's third season in the non-competitive War League.

With the ongoing First World War, once again Manchester United played non-competitive war league football. In the principal tournament they contested the Lancashire Section, in a 30-game season. In the subsidiary tournament they contested Group B of the Lancashire Section, in a group of four teams. However, none of these were considered to be competitive football, and thus their records are not recognised by the Football League.

On 9 October 1917 while Fighting in France during the First World War, former United player Arthur Beadsworth was killed while serving as a Sergeant in the Seventh Battalion of the Royal Leicestershire Regiment of the British Army.

Lancashire Section Principal Tournament

Lancashire Section Subsidiary Tournament Group B

References

Manchester United F.C. seasons
Manchester United